Rakvere Theatre is a professional theatre in Rakvere, Estonia.

History
Rakvere Theatre was established in the fall of 1921, when Rakvere Näitlejate Ring was formed. The building of the Rakvere Theatre was opened with a public ceremony on 24 February 1940, the 22nd anniversary of independent Estonia, the following day the first ever play, August Kitzberg's "Tuulte pöörises" premiered.  The theatre's artistic director is Üllar Saaremäe, and theatre manager is Joonas Tartu.

Rakvere is believed to be the smallest town in Europe, which has its own professional theatre.

As of 2019, the troupe consists of 21 actors, eleven men and ten women:

Gallery

References

External links

Theatres in Estonia
Rakvere
Buildings and structures in Lääne-Viru County
Tourist attractions in Lääne-Viru County